The Cliveden is a private housing estate in mid-level of Route Twisk, Tsuen Wan, New Territories, Hong Kong, next to The Cairnhill. It is a low-density European-style luxury residential development project in the mid-levels of Tsuen Wan District, with a total of 9 residential buildings (there is no 4th block). It was jointly developed by Kerry Properties and Sino Land in 2002. It comprises 9 residential towers of 10 storeys with a total of 210 units.

Transportation
Resident's bus service route: NR335 (The Cliveden to Tsuen Wan MTR station)
KMB: Route 51
Minibus: Route 80

See also
The Cairnhill

References

Tsuen Wan
Tsuen Wan District
Sino Group
Kerry Properties
Residential buildings completed in 2002
Private housing estates in Hong Kong
2002 establishments in Hong Kong